Dorcadion ladikanum is a species of beetle in the family Cerambycidae. It was described by Walter Braun in 1976. It is known from Turkey.

References

ladikanum
Beetles described in 1976